A trade name, trading name, or business name, is a pseudonym used by companies that do not operate under their registered company name. The term for this type of alternative name is a "fictitious" business name. Registering the fictitious name with a relevant government body is often required.

In a number of countries, the phrase "trading as" (abbreviated to t/a) is used to designate a trade name. In the United States, the phrase "doing business as" (abbreviated to DBA, dba, d.b.a., or d/b/a) is used, among others, such as assumed business name or fictitious business name. In Canada, "operating as" (abbreviated to o/a) and "trading as" are used, although "doing business as" is also sometimes used.

A company typically uses a trade name to conduct business using a simpler name rather than using their formal and often lengthier name. Trade names are also used when a preferred name cannot be registered, often because it may already be registered or is too similar to a name that is already registered.

Legal aspects
Using one (or more) fictitious business name(s) does not create one (or more) separate legal entities. The distinction between a registered legal name and a fictitious business name, or trade name, is important because fictitious business names do not always identify the entity that is legally responsible. 

Legal agreements (such as contracts) are normally made using the registered legal name of the business. If a corporation fails to consistently adhere to such important legal formalities like using its registered legal name in contracts, it may be subject to piercing of the corporate veil. 

In English, trade names are generally treated as proper nouns.

By country

Argentina
In Argentina, a trade name is known as a nombre de fantasía ('fantasy' or 'fiction' name), and the legal name of business is called a razón social (social name).

Brazil
In Brazil, a trade name is known as a nome fantasia ('fantasy' or 'fiction' name), and the legal name of business is called razão social (social name).

Canada
In some Canadian jurisdictions, such as Ontario, when a businessperson writes a trade name on a contract, invoice, or cheque, he or she must also add the legal name of the business.

Numbered companies will very often operate as something other than their legal name, which is unrecognizable to the public.

Chile
In Chile, a trade name is known as a nombre de fantasía ('fantasy' or 'fiction' name), and the legal name of business is called a razón social (social name).

Ireland

In Ireland businesses are legally required to register business names where these differ from the surname(s) of the sole trader or partners, or the legal name of a company. The Companies Registration Office publishes a searchable register of such business names.

Japan
In Japan, the word  is used.

Nigeria
In Colonial Nigeria, certain tribes had members that used a variety of trading names to conduct business with the Europeans. Two famous examples were King Perekule VII of Bonny, who was known as Captain Pepple in trade matters, and King Jubo Jubogha of Opobo, who bore the pseudonym Captain Jaja. Both Pepple and Jaja would bequeath their trade names to their royal descendants as official surnames upon their deaths.

Singapore
In Singapore, there is no filing requirement for a "trading as" name, but there are requirements for disclosure of the underlying business or company's registered name and unique entity number.

United Kingdom
In the United Kingdom, there is no filing requirement for a "trading as" name, but there are requirements for disclosure of the owner's true name and some restrictions on the use of certain names.

United States
A minority of U.S. states, including Washington, still use the term trade name to refer to "doing business as" (DBA) names; In most U.S. states now, DBAs are officially referred to using other terms; almost half of states, like New York and Oregon, use the term Assumed Business Name or Assumed Name; nearly as many, like Pennsylvania, use the term Fictitious Name.

For consumer protection purposes, many U.S. jurisdictions require businesses operating with fictitious names to file a DBA statement, though names including the first and last name of the owner may be accepted. This also reduces the possibility of two local businesses operating under the same name, although some jurisdictions do not provide exclusivity for a name, or may allow more than one party to register the same name. Note, though, that this is not a substitute for filing a trademark application. A DBA filing carries no legal weight in establishing trademark rights. In the U.S., trademark rights are acquired by use in commerce, but there can be substantial benefits to filing a trademark application. Sole proprietors are the most common users of DBAs.  Sole proprietors are individual business owners who run their businesses themselves. Since most people in these circumstances use a business name other than their own name, it is often necessary for them to get DBAs.

Generally, a DBA must be registered with a local or state government, or both, depending on the jurisdiction. For example, California, Texas and Virginia require a DBA to be registered with each county (or independent city in the case of Virginia) where the owner does business. Maryland and Colorado have DBAs registered with a state agency. Virginia also requires corporations and LLCs to file a copy of their registration with the county or city to be registered with the State Corporation Commission.

DBA statements are often used in conjunction with a franchise.  The franchisee will have a legal name under which it may sue and be sued, but will conduct business under the franchiser's brand name (which the public would recognize).  A typical real-world example can be found in a well-known pricing mistake case, Donovan v. RRL Corp., 26 Cal. 4th 261 (2001), where the named defendant, RRL Corporation, was a Lexus car dealership doing business as "Lexus of Westminster", but remaining a separate legal entity from Lexus, a division of Toyota Motor Sales, U.S.A., Inc.

In California, filing a DBA statement also requires that a notice of the fictitious name be published in local newspapers for some set period of time to inform the public of the owner's intent to operate under an assumed name. The intention of the law is to protect the public from fraud, by compelling the business owner to first file or register his fictitious business name with the county clerk, and then making a further public record of it by publishing it in a newspaper. Several other states, such as Illinois, require print notices as well.

Uruguay
In Uruguay, a trade name is known as a nombre fantasía, and the legal name of business is called a razón social.

See also

 Pen name
 Rebranding
 Service mark
 Trade dress

References

Brand management
Business law
Product management
Names
Intangible assets